Joseph McGrath was an American politician who served as acting Mayor of Boston during the tenure of James Michael Curley, Chairman of the Massachusetts Democratic Party, and Collector of Customs for the Port of Boston.

Early life and career
McGrath was born on December 20, 1890, in Boston. He graduated from Dorchester High School. While still in high school, McGrath became involved in local politics. At the age of 25 he was elected to the Massachusetts House of Representatives. He served four terms in the state legislature. In 1926 he married Doris E. Pearson of Dorchester. Outside politics McGrath worked in real estate.

City Council
In 1926, McGrath moved to local politics when he was elected to the Boston City Council. In 1931 and 1933 he was elected council president. As council president, McGrath served as acting mayor when James Michael Curley was out of the city. His longest stretch as acting Mayor occurred in 1931 when Curley went abroad for six weeks.

Party chairman
In January 1935, McGrath was named Chairman of the Massachusetts Democratic Party. Although he was a political lieutenant of James Michael Curley, he was accepted by other leaders of the Democratic Party because he worked devotedly for the entire ticket. McGrath's impartiality upset Curley because he expected McGrath to use his influence to help him win the 1936 senatorial election. As chairman, McGrath supported open meetings of the Democratic State Committee and allowed the press to be admitted to some of the meetings. Under his leadership, the Massachusetts Democratic Party built up the best organization they had ever had to that point and by the time of his departure only a few towns remained unorganized. When national committeeman Joseph B. Ely came out against the New Deal, McGrath resisted the demands of some state committee members to remove him from office, as McGrath hoped that Ely would still support the ticket in the 1936 election. Ely, however, would join the American Liberty League and support Republican Alf Landon for President.

Collector of Customs
In 1938, McGrath was appointed Collector of Customs for the Port of Boston. He held this position until his unexpected death on April 25, 1943, at his home in Dorchester. His funeral was attended by a number of dignitaries, including Francis X. Hurley, David I. Walsh, John W. McCormack, James Michael Curley, Philip J. Philbin, Thomas A. Flaherty, Edmund J. Brandon, John F. Fitzgerald, Joseph Timilty, Thomas J. Buckley, William H. Burke, Jr., and Maurice J. Tobin.

See also
 1915 Massachusetts legislature
 1916 Massachusetts legislature
 1917 Massachusetts legislature
 1918 Massachusetts legislature

References

1890 births
1943 deaths
American real estate businesspeople
Boston City Council members
Massachusetts Democratic Party chairs
Massachusetts Democrats
Collectors of the Port of Boston
20th-century American politicians